El Nora Alila, also transliterated as Ayl Nora Alilah, is a piyyut (liturgical poem) that begins the Ne'ilah service at the conclusion of Yom Kippur. The piyyut is recited as part of the Sephardic and Mizrahi liturgy, and has been adopted by some Ashkenazic communities.

The English translation offered below is a lyric rendering, reproducing a rhyme similar to the Hebrew. A more literal translation makes the title and recurring line, "God of awesome deeds". It consists of eight stanzas, each stanza consisting of four lines of five syllables to the line. Each line (in Hebrew) has three words and the fourth line is always two words, "as Thy gates are closed at night" – the gates being shut are presumably those of Heaven's gates for receiving prayers of repentance (modelled after the gates of the Temple, Ezekiel 46:2), and the hymn is one last impassioned plea for Divine pardon in the last minutes of the Day of Atonement. The initial letters of the first six stanzas of the piyyut spell out משה חזק, "Moses, may he be strong", in reference to the piyyut's author Moses ibn Ezra (12th century Spain).

Text

Melodies 

The melody for El Nora Alila is generally sprightly, as is much of the Ne'ilah service, deliberately, coming at the end of a 25-hour fast, when the congregants are probably feeling fatigue and weakness.

See also 
Yom Kippur
Ne'ilah

References

External links 
 
 El Nora Alila at the Jewish Encyclopedia
  video of three melodies - Turkish, Moroccan, and Spanish-Portuguese - to El Nora Alila
  page with multiple videos of different renditions

Hebrew-language songs
Jewish liturgical poems
Jewish prayer and ritual texts
Yom Kippur
Ne'ila
Hebrew words and phrases in Jewish prayers and blessings